Jan de Groote  (10 July 1911 in Beilen – 14 March 1989 in Hoogeveen) was a Dutch farmer and politician of the Farmers' Party (Boerenpartij - BP). He was a councillor of Beilen from 1966 to 1970 and also a Senator from 1966 to 1971.

De Groote was a member of the Dutch Reformed Church, and brother-in-law of BP leader Hendrik Koekoek.

References 
  Parlement.com biography

1911 births
1989 deaths
Dutch farmers
Dutch members of the Dutch Reformed Church
Farmers' Party (Netherlands) politicians
Members of the Senate (Netherlands)
Municipal councillors in Drenthe
People from Midden-Drenthe